Danny Deakin (born 6 September 1993) is an English footballer who plays as an attacking midfielder for Rossington Main F.C.

Career
Deakin played as part of the academy at Sheffield United from 2006, until he was released by the club in 2012. Following his release from Sheffield United, Deakin had spells with Matlock Town and Belper Town.

Deakin moved to the United States to play college soccer at Mercyhurst University in 2013, before transferring to the University of South Carolina in 2015. While at college, Deakin spent time with USL PDL side FC London, and NPSL sides Erie Commodores (formerly Erie Admirals) and Detroit City FC.

On 17 January 2017, Deakin was selected by Orlando City in the 2017 MLS SuperDraft in the third round (64th overall). He officially signed with the club on 3 March 2017. Shortly after signing, Deakin was sent to Orlando City's USL affiliate Orlando City B on loan. He made his debut for Orlando City B on 25 March 2017 against Tampa Bay Rowdies.

Deakin moved permanently to Orlando City B on 19 April 2017.

On April 10, 2018 it was announced that Deakin would return to Detroit City Football Club for their 2018 campaign.

On October 30, 2020 it was announced that Deakin had signed for Hallam.

References

External links
Orlando City bio

1993 births
Living people
English footballers
Association football midfielders
Mercyhurst University alumni
South Carolina Gamecocks men's soccer players
Matlock Town F.C. players
Belper Town F.C. players
FC London players
Detroit City FC players
Orlando City SC draft picks
Orlando City B players
USL League Two players
National Premier Soccer League players
USL Championship players
English expatriate sportspeople in the United States
Expatriate soccer players in the United States
English expatriate footballers
Mercyhurst Lakers athletes
English expatriate sportspeople in Canada
Expatriate soccer players in Canada
Orlando City SC players
Footballers from Sheffield
Hallam F.C. players
Sheffield F.C. players
Curzon Ashton F.C. players
Rossington Main F.C. players